Brahmalokam To Yamalokam Via Bhulokam  is 2010 Telugu-language fantasy comedy film, produced by Rupesh D Gohil, Bekkam Venu Gopal on Utopia Productions Pvt Ltd & Lucky Media banner and directed by Gollapati Nageswara Rao. Starring Rajendra Prasad, Sivaji, Kalyani, Aarti Agarwal, Sonia Deepti and music composed by M. M. Srilekha. The film finished shooting in April of 2010. It was dubbed in Hindi as Yamlok.

Plot
Lord Bramha (Rajendra Prasad) has a tiff with his consort Goddess Saraswathi (Kalyani) and wrongly writes the fate of a girl that she would die the moment she gets married. On the other side, Seenu (Sivaji) is a bachelor getting older and is sent back again to college with the hope that someone will offer his daughter's hand if Seenu completes his degree. On coming to college, he sees Swetha (Sonia) and takes to like her very much. This results in Seenu getting a sound beating in the hands of Swetha's brother-in-law Jackson (Raghubabu). Sreenu's classmate Shobhan Babu (Venumadhav) is a lazy fellow who starts meditating for Lord Bramha on the advice of some saints in a forest. Lord Bramha also gets pleased with Shobhan Babu's penance and appears before him. Brahma grants him a peculiar kind of boon. Bramha gives Shobhan Babu a 'Kalasham' and tells him to drink milk from it and he will be knowing the future. In a coincidence, Sreenu after getting beaten badly by Jackson falls at the same place where the Kalasham is. Inadvertently he drinks the milk in the Kalasham and starts getting knowledge of future events. Since Shobhan Babu and Seenu are friends, they both come to an understanding and earn lakhs of rupees by future-telling. They also come to know how Brahma has written Swetha's fate. Once Sreenu on coming to know that a school bus is going to meet with an accident saves the children from the accident. Yama Dharma Raju (Jaya Prakash Reddy) finds out that the school children have not reached Yamalokam yet, goes to Bramhalokam, and inquires with Bramha. Bramha realizes that this is all caused by the boon he has given to Shobhan. He along with Yama and Chitragupta (AVS) comes to Bhoolokam to take back his boon (Kalasham). Goddess Adi Parashakthi (Laya) only gives one month to them to retrieve the Kalasham. What the trio has done in Bhoolokam and what has all taken place on earth form the rest of the story.

Cast

Soundtrack

Music composed by M. M. Srilekha. Lyrics were written by Bhaskarabhatla Ravikumar. Music released on MADHURA Audio Company.

References

External links

2010s fantasy comedy films
Indian fantasy comedy films
2010s Telugu-language films
2010 comedy films
2010 films
Yama in popular culture